Plantegumia flavaginalis is a moth in the family Crambidae. It is found on the Virgin Islands.

References

Moths described in 1894
Pyraustinae